The 2016 Saudi Crown Prince Cup Final was the 41st final of the Crown Prince Cup. It took place on 19 February 2016 at the King Fahd International Stadium in Riyadh, Saudi Arabia and was contested between Al-Ahli and Al-Hilal. It was Al-Ahli's 13th Crown Prince Cup final and Al-Hilal's 16th final. This was the fifth meeting between these two clubs in the final. Al-Ahli won once in 2015 while Al-Hilal won three times in 2003, 2006, and 2010.

Al-Hilal won the match 2–1 and secured their record-extending 13th Crown Prince Cup title.

Teams

Venue

On 27 January 2015, the King Fahd International Stadium was announced as the host of the final venue. This was the 14th Crown Prince Cup final hosted in the King Fahd International Stadium following those in 1992, 1994, 1998, 2003, 2004, 2005, 2006, 2008, 2009, 2010, 2012, 2013, 2014 and 2015.

The King Fahd International Stadium was built in 1982 and was opened in 1987. The stadium was used as a venue for the 1992, 1995, and the 1997 editions of the FIFA Confederations Cup. Its current capacity is 68,752 and it is used by the Saudi Arabia national football team, Al-Nassr, Al-Shabab, and major domestic matches.

Background
Al-Hilal reached a record 16th final after a 4–0 win against city rivals Al-Shabab. This was Al-Hilal's ninth final in a row. Previously, they won finals in 1964, 1995, 2000, 2003, 2005, 2006, 2008, 2009, 2010, 2011, 2012, and 2013, and lost in 1999, 2014 and 2015.

Al-Ahli reached their 13th final, after a 1–0 win against derby rivals Al-Ittihad. They reached their second consecutive final. They won last season's final after defeating Al-Hilal 2–1. Previously, they won finals in 1957, 1970, 1998, 2002, 2007 and 2015, and lost in 1958, 1974, 2003, 2004, 2006 and 2010.

This was the fifth meeting between these two sides in the Crown Prince Cup final. Al-Ahli won once in 2015 while Al-Hilal won three times in 2003, 2006 and 2010. This was the 12th meeting between these two sides in the Crown Prince Cup; Al-Hilal won 5 times, Al-Ahli won 3 times and the two teams drew three times. The two teams played each other once in the season prior to the final. The match ended in a 2–1 win for Al-Ahli.

Road to the final 

Key: (H) = Home; (A) = Away

Match

Details

{| width="100%"
|valign="top" width="40%"|

Statistics

See also

 2015–16 Saudi Crown Prince Cup
 2015–16 Saudi Professional League
 2016 King Cup

References

External links

Sports competitions in Saudi Arabia
February 2016 sports events in Asia
Al-Ahli Saudi FC matches
Al Hilal SFC matches